This is a list of nicknames for counties of the United Kingdom. This includes the counties of England, Scotland, Northern Ireland and Wales. Counties are only included if they have a nickname.

List

See also 
List of counties of the United Kingdom
List of Irish county nicknames

References

Nicknames
United Kingdom County